Petto is an Italian adjective meaning "breasted" or "chested" (as in white-breasted cormorant or, in Italian, cormorano pettobianco). It is also a Japanese gairaigo noun meaning "pet". It may refer to:

People
Samuel Petto ( 1624–1711) English Calvinist clergyman and theologian
Tomasso Petto ( 1879–1905), American mobster and contract killer

Other
Doppio Petto, 1997 Italian-language film
In petto, an Italian term used in the Catholic Church referring to an action or thing meant to be secret; Latin: in pectore
Kimi wa Petto, a 2000–2005 Japanese-language comic book (manga) series, that was also adapted for film and television [see: Tramps Like Us]
Voce di petto, a term used within vocal music [see: Chest voice]